Gideon Kouoru is a Papua New Guinean rugby league footballer who represented Papua New Guinea at the 1995 World Cup.

He played in eight test matches for Papua New Guinea between 1987 and 1995.

References

Living people
Papua New Guinean rugby league players
Papua New Guinean sportsmen
Papua New Guinea national rugby league team players
Rugby league wingers
Rugby league locks
Year of birth missing (living people)
Place of birth missing (living people)